Spanish Fork Municipal Airport - Woodhouse Field (FAA LID:SPK) is a general aviation airport located in north Spanish Fork, Utah, United States, that serves southern Utah County.

The Spanish Fork airport is home to Wings and Wheels: Utah's Festival of Speed (formerly Aeroplanes, Trains, and Automobiles), an annual event celebrating anything that flies through the air or down the road. 

The City of Spanish Fork participated in the Federal Works Progress Administration (WPA) program that offered to build airports for cities during the late 1920's and 1930's. cities needed to provide the required acreage of fenced land with road access to be eligible. The (then) 160-acre airport was built and certified in the summer of 1931. Between 1935 and 1936 the City of Springville, Utah made a request to build an airport. The Utah Aeronautics Board (UAB) and Civil Aviation board (CAB) rejected Springville's proposal due to the close proximity to the Spanish Fork Airport. The UAB and CAB, predecessor to the Federal Aviation Administration (FAA), suggested that the two cities team-up to operate the Airport. Springville paid Spanish Fork half of the airport costs and built the required access road to the airport. In 2019, Springville bowed out as a partner of the airport and Spanish Fork City once again has sole ownership.  

The airport has continued to develop over the years and as of 2021 was a home base for 240 aircraft, a fixed base operator (FBO), multiple flight schools, and an aircraft manufacturing company.

See also

 List of airports in Utah

References
AirNav: KSPK

External links

 
 

Airports in Utah
Transportation in Utah County, Utah
Buildings and structures in Spanish Fork, Utah
Springville, Utah